Benjamin Palm (born 24 September 2001) is a Ghanaian junior tennis player.

Palm has a career high ATP doubles ranking of 1,907, achieved on 6 January 2020. Palm has a career high ITF juniors ranking of 923 achieved on 31 December 2018. 

Palm has represented Ghana at Davis Cup, where he has a win-loss record of 1–0.

Davis Cup

Participations: (1–0)

   indicates the outcome of the Davis Cup match followed by the score, date, place of event, the zonal classification and its phase, and the court surface.

References

External links 
 
 
 

2001 births
Living people
Ghanaian male tennis players
Competitors at the 2019 African Games
African Games competitors for Ghana